La Breya (2,374 m) is a mountain of the Mont Blanc massif, overlooking Champex in the canton of Valais. It is accessible by chair lift from Champex, the upper station being located at Grands Plans (2,194 m). From there a trail leads to its summit.

References

External links
 Chair lift
 La Breya on Hikr

Mountains of the Alps
Mountains of Valais
Cable cars in Switzerland
Mountains of Switzerland
Two-thousanders of Switzerland
Mont Blanc massif